The 2008–09 Coca-Cola Tigers season was the seventh season of the franchise in the Philippine Basketball Association (PBA).

Key dates
August 30: The 2008 PBA Draft took place in Fort Bonifacio, Taguig.
September 1: The free agency period started.

Draft picks

Roster

Depth chart

Philippine Cup

Standings

Game log

|- bgcolor="#edbebf"
| 1
| October 4
| Talk 'N Text
| 97–98
| Buenafe (20)
| Taulava (14)
| Cabagnot (7)
| Araneta Coliseum
| 0–1
|- bgcolor="#edbebf"
| 2
| October 11
| Alaska
| 62–69
| Taulava (21)
| Taulava, Belasco (9) 
| Cabagnot (4)
| Negros Occidental 
| 0–2
|- bgcolor="#bbffbb"
| 3
| October 15
| Purefoods
| 103-102
| Taulava, Belasco (20)
| Telan (16) 
| Taulava (8)
| Araneta Coliseum 
| 1–2
|- bgcolor="#edbebf"
| 4
| October 17
| Air21
| 84–95
| Belasco (22)
| Taulava (16) 
| Buenafe (7)
| Araneta Coliseum 
| 1–3
|- bgcolor="#edbebf"
| 5
| October 22
| Sta. Lucia
| 82–83
| Taulava (24)
| Taulava (15) 
| Cabagnot, Belasco (4)
| Araneta Coliseum 
| 1–4
|- bgcolor="#bbffbb"
| 6
| October 26
| Rain or Shine
| 112-96
| Taulava (30)
| Belasco (13) 
| Cabagnot (8)
| Araneta Coliseum 
| 2–4

|- bgcolor="#bbffbb"
| 7
| November 2
| Red Bull
| 97-92
| Taulava (17)
| Telan (10) 
| Cabagnot, Taulava (3)
| Araneta Coliseum 
| 3–4
|- bgcolor="#edbebf"
| 8
| November 8
| Ginebra
| 77–81
| Belasco (22)
| Belasco (14) 
| Cabagnot (7)
| Lucena City 
| 3–5
|- bgcolor="#edbebf"
| 9
| November 12
| San Miguel
| 86–89
| Cabagnot, Telan (14)
| Telan (11) 
| Cabagnot, Taulava (4)
| Cuneta Astrodome 
| 3–6
|- bgcolor="#edbebf"
| 10
| November 15
| Air21
| 101–111
| Cabagnot (19)
| Taulava (25) 
| Cabagnot (11)
| Cuneta Astrodome 
| 3–7
|- bgcolor="#bbffbb"
| 11
| November 21
| Purefoods
| 93-72
| Buenafe (18)
| Taulava (12) 
| Cabagnot (5)
| Araneta Coliseum 
| 4–7
|- bgcolor="#bbffbb"
| 12
| November 23
| Rain or Shine
| 84-73
| Taulava (16)
| Telan (11) 
| Cabagnot (11)
| Cuneta Astrodome 
| 5–7
|- bgcolor="#edbebf"
| 13
| November 27
| Ginebra
| 77–84
| Telan (17)
| Taulava (14) 
| Buenafe (3)
| Olivarez Gym
| 5–8

|- bgcolor="#edbebf"
| 14
| December 5
| Alaska Aces
| 83–99
| Taulava (20)
| Taulava (15) 
| Dimaunahan (6)
| Araneta Coliseum 
| 5–9
|- bgcolor="#edbebf"
| 15
| December 7
| Talk 'N Text
| 82–90
| Macapagal (31)
| Taulava (22) 
| Taulava, Enrile (5)
| Araneta Coliseum 
| 5–10
|- bgcolor="#bbffbb"
| 16
| December 12
| San Miguel
| 105-91
| Belasco (23)
| Belasco (15) 
| Cabagnot (6)
| Araneta Coliseum 
| 6–10
|- bgcolor="#edbebf"
| 17
| December 14
| Sta. Lucia
| 69–90
| Telan (20)
| Telan (15) 
| Arigo, Dimaunahan (4)
| Araneta Coliseum 
| 6–11
|- bgcolor="#bbffbb"
| 18
| December 19
| Red Bull
| 88-86
| Arigo (31)
| Telan (14) 
| Cabagnot (7)
| Ynares Center 
| 7–11

Playoffs

Statistics

Philippine Cup

Fiesta Conference

Awards and records

Awards

Records
Note: Coca-Cola Tigers Records Only

Transactions

Free Agents

Additions

Subtractions

References

Powerade Tigers seasons
Coca-cola Tigers